Declan William Bennett (born 20 March 1981) is an English singer-songwriter, actor and playwright. He gained prominence as a member of the band Point Break, before going on to perform on London's West End and as a solo musician. He is known on screen for his roles as Charlie Cotton in the soap opera EastEnders and Jonathan Roberts in the ITV series The Long Call.

Early life and education
Bennett was born in Coventry and has an older brother Kieran. Like his EastEnders character, Bennett is of Irish descent; his mother Rose is from Westmeath, and his paternal grandparents are from Dublin and Wexford. Bennett attended Christ the King Primary School in Coundon and then Cardinal Newman Catholic School and Community College.

Career

Early ventures
As a teenager, Bennett performed with the Belgrade Youth Theatre and the Coventry Youth Operetta Group (YOG) Coventry, including appearances in Willy Russell's Our Day Out in September 1996, and in Boy Band, which featured a number of his own compositions. He also performed with the National Youth Music Theatre, in The Kissing-Dance 1999.

Music
In May 1999, Bennett was one of nine teenagers chosen to sing live on the ITV morning TV show This Morning in a feature that put together a boy band. Following his appearance, he was contacted in the studio by another band, Point Break, which featured Brett Adams and David 'Ollie' Oliver from UK children's TV programme Byker Grove, who were signed to Warner Music, and who were looking for a new member. The band released five singles, four of which made the UK top 20, and an album, which was number one in three countries in South east Asia, including Japan, and made the UK top 40. Bennett left the band in December 2000.

In January 2005, Bennett released his first solo album under the pseudonym "Sumladfromcov" entitled The Painters Ball on his own record label, Covboy Records. This was followed by a limited-edition EP, The Kitchen, in May 2006.

Now performing as a singer-songwriter under his own name, Bennett released a five-track iTunes-only EP in March 2007 entitled 10 Nelson Road. His second full-length album, An Innocent Evening Of Drinking, was released on 14 April 2008. Therapy, an iTunes-only single packaged with two remixes — Olivia's Mix and New York Live Studio Mix — was released in the U.S. on 27 April 2009 and in the rest of the world on 23 March 2009.

On 31 January 2010, Bennett performed on the Grammy Awards with Green Day as a cast member of the rock opera American Idiot, which ran on Broadway from 20 April 2010 to 24 April 2011. Bennett was a member of the ensemble, understudying and performing the role of Will.

Bennett released the album record:BREAKUP on 25 April 2011 in New York. A live and acoustic version was released on Monday 19 August 2013.

Theatre
In January 2002, Bennett was given the part of Guru Dazzle in Boy George's West End show Taboo, which received four Olivier Award nominations and he later took over one of the lead roles, Billy, playing alongside Matt Lucas, Boy George, and Julian Clary among others until the show closed in London in April 2003.

Bennett also played the role of Billy in the UK tour of the show from December 2003 to 2004.

In September 2006, Bennett took over the role of Roger Davis in the American national tour of Broadway rock opera Rent. He completed a nine-month tour of the United States from September 2006 to May 2007. He reprised the role on Broadway from October 2007 until May 2008.

In 2013, Bennett premiered the romantic lead Guy in the West End production of Once opposite Zrinka Cvitešić as Girl at the Phoenix Theatre in London.

In March 2016, it was announced Bennett would star in the titular role of Jesus Christ Superstar at the Open Air Theatre Regents Park.

In 2019, he starred in The View UpStairs playing the role of Dale at the Soho Theatre, in London from 18 July to 24 August.

In June 2021 it was announced Declan Bennett would be starring as Billy Bigelow in the Regents Park Open Air Theatre summer production of “Carousel”. This acclaimed show ran from 31 July 2021 to 25 September 2021.

Bennett created the one-man show Boy Out the City. It had its work-in-progress showcase in early 2021 before premiering the full thing at the Westival Music + Arts Festival in Westport, Ireland that 24 October, followed by a London premiere at the Turbine Theatre on 9 November.

On 8th April 2022, it was announced Bennett would star as the Duke de Monroth in Moulin Rouge! (musical) on Broadway beginning on 10th May 2022, following Tam Mutu, at the Al Hirschfeld Theatre.

Television and film
After a number of small film and television roles, on 22 January 2014, it was announced Bennett would join the cast of EastEnders as Charlie Cotton, the long-lost grandson of  Dot Branning (June Brown). EastEnders executive producer, Dominic Treadwell-Collins, questioned whether Charlie (named after Charlie Cotton) would be "kind" like his grandmother or "evil" like his father Nick Cotton (John Altman). Bennett first appeared on 10 March 2014. In 2015, it was revealed Bennett would exit the series. During his time, he had married Ronnie Mitchell (Samantha Womack), gotten in a car accident, had an affair with Ronnie's sister Roxy Mitchell (Rita Simons) and impersonated a cop.

On 5 April 2017, it was confirmed that Bennett would reprise his EastEnders role for the forthcoming season after months of speculation. His first episode back aired on 5 May 2017.

Bennett starred opposite Ben Aldridge in the 2021 adaptation of The Long Call on ITV and BritBox.

Personal life
Bennett is gay. He lived in New York City and London for a number of years before moving to rural Oxfordshire, where he currently lives with his life partner, fellow actor and singer Fra Fee.

Discography
With Point Break

Solo releases

References

External links

Reviews of Our Day Out on Willy Russell's Official-Unofficial website
Article on Boy Band on website CWN News & Information for Coventry & Warwickshire
Article and reviews about The Kissing-Dance on the composer's official site
Theatre's webpage about Taboo London production
Official Declan Bennett website

1981 births
Living people
English male singer-songwriters
English pop singers
English male soap opera actors
English male stage actors
English gay actors
English gay musicians
English gay writers
Gay songwriters
Gay singers
Gay composers
English LGBT songwriters
English LGBT singers
LGBT producers
People from Coventry
English people of Irish descent
21st-century English male singers
20th-century English LGBT people
21st-century English LGBT people